Leviatán Fútbol Club is a football club that plays in the Liga Premier de México – Serie A. It is based in Mexico City.

History
The team was founded in November 2020 when a group of five entrepreneurs who had previously managed the Club Mayas in the Liga TDP decided to start a franchise that would compete in the Liga Premier de México.

In July the team announced Miguel Salas as their first manager, in addition to the use of the Estadio Neza 86 as the setting for their home games. The team was officially entered into soccer competitions on July 30, 2021, when its entry into the Liga Premier – Serie A was announced, the club was placed in Group 2 of this category.

The team officially debuted on September 19, 2021 with a 1–3 loss against C.F. La Piedad. Levatián F.C. got their first win on October 13 when they defeated Escorpiones F.C. by 3–4.

In January 2023, the team became famous internationally because they played the match against Cafetaleros de Chiapas with fake Inter Milan kits. The club's board argued the theft of their uniforms as the reason for the use of those clothes, however, it was later revealed that the problem was a consequence of the club's financial and institutional problems.

Stadium

Leviatán F.C. plays the home matches at Estadio Jesús Martínez "Palillo", a multi-use stadium located in the Magdalena Mixhuca Sports City in Mexico City. The stadium has a capacity of 6,000 people.

Occasionally the team also plays in the Estadio Neza 86, a football stadium in Ciudad Nezahualcóyotl, a commuter town located east of Mexico City in the State of Mexico. The stadium is located on the grounds of the main campus of the Universidad Tecnológica de Nezahualcóyotl. It has a capacity of 20,000 people.

Players

Current squad

Managers 
  Miguel Salas (2021)
  Jaime Cruz (2021–2022)
  José Alberto Pérez (2022)
  Héctor Anguiano (2022)
  Carlos Valdez (2023–)

References

External links 

Football clubs in Mexico City
Association football clubs established in 2020
2020 establishments in Mexico
Liga Premier de México